The men's all-events competition at the 2014 Asian Games in Incheon was held from 23 to 30 September 2014 at Anyang Hogye Gymnasium.

All-events scores are compiled by totaling series scores from the singles, doubles, trios and team competitions.

Schedule
All times are Korea Standard Time (UTC+09:00)

Results

References 

Results at ABF Website

External links
Official website

Men's all-events